Sovodenj is a village in the Municipality of Gorenja Vas–Poljane in the Upper Carniola region of Slovenia. It lies at the confluence of four streams: the Javorščica, Podosojnica, Podjelovščica, and Zakoparska Grapa. At Sovodenj these form the Hobovščica, a tributary of the Poljane Sora River.

References

External links

Sovodenj on Geopedia

Populated places in the Municipality of Gorenja vas-Poljane